The Organization of American Historians (OAH), formerly known as the Mississippi Valley Historical Association, is  the largest professional society dedicated to the teaching and study of American history. OAH's members in the U.S. and abroad include college and university professors; historians, students; precollegiate teachers; archivists, museum curators, and other public historians; and a variety of scholars employed in government and the private sector. The OAH publishes the Journal of American History. Among its various programs, OAH conducts an annual conference each spring, and has a robust speaker bureau—the OAH Distinguished Lectureship Program.

The organization's mission is to promote excellence in the scholarship, teaching, and presentation of American history, and encourage wide discussion of historical questions and equitable treatment of all practitioners of history. Membership is open to all who wish to support its mission.

In 2010, its individual membership was approximately 8,000 and its institutional membership approximately 1,250. For its 2009 fiscal year ending June 30, 2009, the organization's operating budget was approximately $2.9 million. In its 2018 annual report, membership in the organization "stabilized" with approximately 7,000 members. In fiscal year 2019 (ending June 30, 2019), the organization's budget was $3.66 million.

History 

OAH formed as the Mississippi Valley Historical Association at a meeting in Lincoln, Nebraska, of seven historical societies of the Mississippi Valley on October 17 and 18, 1907.  The organization, devoted to studying the Mississippi Valley region, began a tradition of holding an annual meeting each year, and began quarterly publication in 1914 of the Mississippi Valley Historical Review.  As the scholarly emphasis of the organization and its journal developed and spread over time, its initial emphasis on the Mississippi Valley came under sharp challenge from members who wanted a better title and a wider scope.  Ray Billington, OAH president in 1962-1963, detailed four issues that arose and caused bitter quarreling during the discussion about the proposed name change in a 1978 Journal of American History essay:  the desire to use the association's prestige to fight for liberal reforms,  to change the association's name to represent a national scope, to democratize its oligarchical structure, and to take a firm stand against racial discrimination in terms of hotels and meeting cities. The reformers were successful and the Mississippi Valley Historical Review was renamed the Journal of American History and the organization, correspondingly, was renamed the Organization of American Historians the following year.

Indiana University was selected as home for the editorial offices of the Mississippi Valley Historical Review predecessor to the Journal of American History in 1963. Prior to relocating to Indiana, the editorial offices were located at Tulane University. The organization moved its business offices to Indiana in the summer of 1970 from its home on the campus of the University of Utah in Salt Lake City, Utah. The organization's headquarters are in Bloomington, Indiana on the campus of Indiana University in the Raintree House (also referred to as the Millen-Stallknecht House, #105-055-80021 in City of Bloomington Historic Sites and Structures Inventory).The Raintree House is a Greek Revival style brick house. The house gets its name from two large raintrees (Koelreuteria paniculata), which stand on the property. Built by William Moffett Millen c. 1845, it is an excellent example of the Georgian house plan favored by well-to-do farmers in southern Indiana and the Upland South in the mid-nineteenth century.

The OAH was admitted to the American Council of Learned Societies in 1971. It is a foundational partner of the National Coalition for History and the National Humanities Alliance.

Advocacy 
Guided by its mission, the OAH regularly advocates for the study, teaching, and presentation of American history, the equitable treatment of all those who work in the field, and public engagement with history. The OAH is a member of the National Humanities Alliance and National Coalition for History and regularly participates in advocacy efforts related to federal funding for the National Archives and Records Administration, the National Historical Publications and Records Administration, National Endowment for the Humanities, etc.

The Organization often submits amicus curiae briefs for matters being argued before the U.S. Supreme Court as well as district courts. In doing so it aims to present the court with an accurate account of the history of the cases being litigated. The OAH does not advocate for a particular legal standard rather, as a steward of history, it seeks to ensure that the Court is presented with accurate portrayals of American history. The most recently submitted brief was in the case of Dobbs v. Jackson Women's Health Organization. Previous briefs include those submitted for Perry v. Hollingsworth, U.S. v. Windsor,  Obergefell v. Hodges, and In re: National Prescription Opiate Litigation.

Advocating for inclusive history education is another key component of the OAH's advocacy efforts. It is part of the Learn from History Coalition, which seeks to educate parents, teachers, and community members on how to support inclusive history in schools. And, in 2021 it began producing a public webinar series, The Future of the Past, that looks at the diverse history behind contemporary events, such as the January 6, 2021, Capitol riot.

Governance 
The Organization of American Historians is a 501(c)(3) non-profit incorporated in Nebraska in 1907. It is governed by an Executive Board, which is composed of OAH officers, former presidents who continue to serve for two years immediately succeeding their presidency, and nine elected members. The OAH Executive Committee is composed of the officers of the OAH and the immediate past president. Both the Executive Director and the Executive Editor serve on the board and executive committee as non-voting members. In addition to the Executive Board, there are forty-seven service and award committees made up of approximately 350 member volunteers who serve two or three year terms.

Programs 
The OAH Conference on American History brings together nearly 2,000 historians and features between 700 and 900 speakers participating in an average of 150 paper sessions, workshops, and events on all facets of American history over four days each spring. The central theme for each conference is determined by a program committee and the then president elect. The conference (previously the annual meeting) has been held every year since the organization began, with the exception of 1945 due to war time restrictions.

In 1994, the Organization began working with the National Park Service to produce a wide range of projects, including scholars’ visits to national park sites, administrative histories, historic resource studies, national landmarks theme studies, peer review of interpretive material, curriculum development, and conferences and seminars. Since the date of the first cooperative agreement between the OAH and NPS, more than 100 reports have been produced for NPS units around the country. The OAH serves as the program manager, overseeing the historians working on the various projects and ensuring their timely completion.

The Distinguished Lectureship Program (DLP), the OAH speakers bureau, was established in 1980 by then president Gerda Lerner as a way of bringing the expertise of members to a broader audience.  Each year a new roster historians are appointed to a three-year term. In addition to traditional, in-person events, the program began offering the option of virtual lectures in 2020.

Publications 
The Mississippi Valley Historical Review began in 1914 and was published quarterly under that name until 1962 when it was changed to the Journal of American History. The JAH is a quarterly, peer-reviewed publication and is the journal of record for the field of U.S. history. In addition to scholarly articles, it regularly publishes book reviews, movie reviews, public history reviews, digital humanities reviews, and, each March, a “Textbook and Teaching” section that is freely available on their publisher’s, Oxford University Press, website. Additionally, one article each issue is designated “Editor’s Choice” and is opened to the public. A nine-person editorial board guides the review and selection of articles for publication.

List of Mississippi Valley Historical Association and OAH Presidents

Mississippi Valley Historical Association Presidents
 Francis A. Sampson (1907)
 Thomas M. Owen (1907–1908)
 Clarence W. Alvord (1908–1909)
 Orin G. Libby (1909–1910)
 Benjamin F. Shambaugh (1910–1911)
 Andrew C. McLaughlin (1911–1912)
 Reuben G. Thwaites (1912–1913)
 James A. James (1913–1914)
 Isaac Joslin Cox (1914–1915)
 Dunbar Rowland (1915–1916)
 Frederic L. Paxson (1916–1917)
 St. George L. Sioussat (1917–1918)
 Harlow Lindley (1918–1919)
 Milo M. Quaife (1919–1920)
 Chauncey S. Boucher (1920–1921)
 William E. Connelley (1921–1922)
 Solon J. Buck (1922–1923)
 Eugene C. Barker (1923–1924)
 Frank Heywood Hodder (1924–1925)
 James A. Woodburn (1925–1926)
 Otto L. Schmidt (1926–1927)
 Joseph Schafer (1927–1928)
 Charles W. Ramsdell (1928–1929)
 Homer C. Hockett (1929–1930)
 Louise P. Kellogg (1930–1931)
 Beverley W. Bond Jr. (1931–1932)
 John D. Hicks (1932–1933)
 Jonas Viles (1933–1934)
 Lester B. Shippee (1934–1935)
 Louis Pelzer (1935–1936)
 Edward E. Dale (1936–1937)
 Clarence E. Carter (1937–1938)
 William O. Lynch (1938–1939)
 James G. Randall (1939–1940)
 Carl F. Wittke (1940–1941)
 Arthur C. Cole (1941–1942)
 Charles H. Ambler (1942–1943)
 Theodore C. Blegen (1943–1944)

 William C. Binkley (1944–1946)
 Herbert A. Kellar (1946–1947)
 Ralph P. Bieber (1947–1948)
 Dwight L. Dumond (1948–1949)
 Carl C. Rister (1949–1950)
 Elmer Ellis (1950–1951)
 Merle E. Curti (1951–1952)
 James L. Sellers (1952–1953)
 Fred A. Shannon (1953–1954)
 Walter P. Webb (1954–1955)
 Edward C. Kirkland (1955–1956)
 Thomas D. Clark (1956–1957)
 Wendell H. Stephenson (1957–1958)
 William T. Hutchinson (1958–1959)
 Frederick Merk (1959–1960)
 Fletcher M. Green (1960–1961)
 Paul W. Gates (1961–1962)
 Ray Allen Billington (1962–1963)
 Avery O. Craven (1963–1964)

OAH Presidents
 John W. Caughey (1964–1965)
 George E. Mowry (1965–1966)
 Thomas C. Cochran (1966–1967)
 Thomas A. Bailey (1967–1968)
 C. Vann Woodward (1968–1969)
 Merrill Jensen (1969–1970)
 David M. Potter (1970–1971)
 Edmund S. Morgan (1971–1972)
 T. Harry Williams (1972–1973)
 John Higham (1973–1974)
 John Hope Franklin (1974–1975)
 Frank Freidel (1975–1976)
 Richard W. Leopold (1976–1977)
 Kenneth M. Stampp (1977–1978)
 Eugene D. Genovese (1978–1979)
 Carl N. Degler (1979–1980)
 William A. Williams (1980–1981)
 Gerda Lerner (1981–1982)
 Allan G. Bogue (1982–1983)
 Anne Firor Scott (1983–1984)

 Arthur S. Link (1984–1985)
 William E. Leuchtenburg (1985–1986)
 Leon F. Litwack (1986–1987)
 Stanley Nider Katz (1987–1988)
 David Brion Davis (1988–1989)
 Louis R. Harlan (1989–1990)
 Mary Frances Berry (1990–1991)
 Joyce Appleby (1991–1992)
 Lawrence W. Levine (1992–1993)
 Eric Foner (1993–1994)
 Gary B. Nash (1994–1995)
 Michael Kammen (1995–1996)
 Linda K. Kerber (1996–1997)
 George M. Fredrickson (1997–1998)
 William H. Chafe (1998–1999)
 David Montgomery (1999–2000)
 Kenneth T. Jackson (2000–2001)
 Darlene Clark Hine (2001–2002)
 Ira Berlin (2002–2003)
 Jacquelyn Dowd Hall (2003–2004)
 James O. Horton (2004–2005)
 Vicki Ruiz (2005–2006)
 Richard White (2006–2007)
 Nell Irvin Painter (2007–2008)
 Pete Daniel (2008–2009)
 Elaine Tyler May (2009–2010)
 David A. Hollinger (2010–2011)
 Alice Kessler-Harris (2011–2012)
 Albert M. Camarillo (2012–2013)
 Alan M. Kraut (2013–2014)
 Patricia Nelson Limerick (2014–2015)
 Jon Butler (2015–2016)
 Nancy F. Cott (2016–2017)
 Edward L. Ayers (2017–2018)
 Earl Lewis (2018–2019)
 Joanne Meyerowitz (2019–2020)
 George J. Sánchez (2020–2021)
 Philip J. Deloria (2021–2022)
 Erika Lee (2022– )

OAH Awards and Prizes
The following is a list of Awards and Prizes given by Organization of American Historians.
Willi Paul Adams Award
Erik Barnouw Award
Ray Allen Billington Prize
Binkley-Stephenson Award
Civil War and Reconstruction Book Award (formerly the Avery O. Craven Award)
Merle Curti Intellectual History Award
Merle Curti Social History Award
John D'Emilio LGBTQ History Dissertation Award
Friend of History Award
Ellis W. Hawley Prize
OAH-IEHS John Higham Travel Grants
John Higham Research Fellowship
Darlene Clark Hine Award
Huggins-Quarles Award
JAAS Travel Grants
Richard W. Leopold Prize
Lerner–Scott Dissertation Prize – established in 1992 and named for Gerda Lerner and Anne Firor Scott
Lawrence W. Levine Award
Liberty Legacy Foundation Award
Samuel and Marion Merrill Graduate Student Travel Grants
David Montgomery Award
Mary Nickliss Prize in U.S. Women’s and/or Gender History
OAH Presidents’ Travel Fund for Emerging Historians
Louis Pelzer Memorial Award
James A. Rawley Prize
Roy Rosenzweig Distinguished Service Award
Stanton-Horton Award for Excellence in National Park Service History
Tachau Teacher of the Year Award
David Thelen Award
Frederick Jackson Turner Award

See also
 American Historical Association

References

Further reading
 Kirkendall, Richard S., ed. The Organization of American Historians and the Writing and Teaching of American History (2011), essays on the history of the OAH, and on teaching main themes

External links

OAH Conference on American History
Journal of American History website
OAH Magazine of History website
OAH Distinguished Lectureship Program
OAH Archives

 
Historians of the United States
History organizations based in the United States
Organizations established in 1907
Professional associations based in the United States
1907 establishments in the United States